This list contains a list of EC numbers for the fourth group, EC 4, lyases, placed in numerical order as determined by the Nomenclature Committee of the International Union of Biochemistry and Molecular Biology. All official information is tabulated at the website of the committee. The database is developed and maintained by Andrew McDonald.

EC 4.1: Carbon-Carbon Lyases

EC 4.1.1: Carboxy-lyases
 : pyruvate decarboxylase
 : oxalate decarboxylase
 : acetoacetate decarboxylase
 : acetolactate decarboxylase
 : cis-aconitate decarboxylase
 : benzoylformate decarboxylase
 : oxalyl-CoA decarboxylase
 : malonyl-CoA decarboxylase
 : aspartate 1-decarboxylase
 : aspartate 4-decarboxylase
 EC 4.1.1.13: deleted
 : valine decarboxylase
 : glutamate decarboxylase
 : hydroxyglutamate decarboxylase
 : ornithine decarboxylase
 : lysine decarboxylase
 : arginine decarboxylase
 : diaminopimelate decarboxylase
 : phosphoribosylaminoimidazole carboxylase
 : histidine decarboxylase
 : orotidine-5′-phosphate decarboxylase
 : aminobenzoate decarboxylase
 : tyrosine decarboxylase
 EC 4.1.1.26: Now included with  aromatic-L-amino-acid decarboxylase
 EC 4.1.1.27: Now included with  aromatic-L-amino-acid decarboxylase
 : aromatic-L-amino-acid decarboxylase
 : sulfoalanine decarboxylase
 : pantothenoylcysteine decarboxylase
 : phosphoenolpyruvate carboxylase
 : phosphoenolpyruvate carboxykinase (GTP)
 : diphosphomevalonate decarboxylase
 : dehydro-L-gulonate decarboxylase
 : UDP-glucuronate decarboxylase
 : phosphopantothenoylcysteine decarboxylase
 : uroporphyrinogen decarboxylase
 : phosphoenolpyruvate carboxykinase (diphosphate)
 : ribulose-bisphosphate carboxylase
 : hydroxypyruvate decarboxylase
 EC 4.1.1.41: Now , (S)-methylmalonyl-CoA decarboxylase
 : carnitine decarboxylase
 : phenylpyruvate decarboxylase
 : 4-carboxymuconolactone decarboxylase
 : aminocarboxymuconate-semialdehyde decarboxylase
 : o-pyrocatechuate decarboxylase
 : tartronate-semialdehyde synthase
 : indole-3-glycerol-phosphate synthase
 : phosphoenolpyruvate carboxykinase (ATP)
 : adenosylmethionine decarboxylase
 : 3-hydroxy-2-methylpyridine-4,5-dicarboxylate 4-decarboxylase
 : 6-methylsalicylate decarboxylase
 : phenylalanine decarboxylase
 : dihydroxyfumarate decarboxylase
 : 4,5-dihydroxyphthalate decarboxylase
 : 3-oxolaurate decarboxylase
 : methionine decarboxylase
 : orsellinate decarboxylase
 : gallate decarboxylase
 : stipitatonate decarboxylase
 : 4-hydroxybenzoate decarboxylase
 : gentisate decarboxylase
 : protocatechuate decarboxylase
 : 2,2-dialkylglycine decarboxylase (pyruvate)
 : phosphatidylserine decarboxylase
 : uracil-5-carboxylate decarboxylase
 : UDP-galacturonate decarboxylase
 : 5-oxopent-3-ene-1,2,5-tricarboxylate decarboxylase
 : 3,4-dihydroxyphthalate decarboxylase
 EC 4.1.1.70: Now , glutaconyl-CoA decarboxylase
 : 2-oxoglutarate decarboxylase
 : branched-chain-2-oxoacid decarboxylase
 : tartrate decarboxylase
 : indolepyruvate decarboxylase
 : 5-guanidino-2-oxopentanoate decarboxylase
 : arylmalonate decarboxylase
 : 4-oxalocrotonate decarboxylase
 : acetylenedicarboxylate decarboxylase
 : sulfopyruvate decarboxylase
 : 4-hydroxyphenylpyruvate decarboxylase
 : threonine-phosphate decarboxylase
 : phosphonopyruvate decarboxylase
 : 4-hydroxyphenylacetate decarboxylase
 : D-dopachrome decarboxylase
 : 3-dehydro-L-gulonate-6-phosphate decarboxylase
 : diaminobutyrate decarboxylase
 : malonyl-S-ACP decarboxylase
 : biotin-independent malonate decarboxylase
 EC 4.1.1.89: Now , biotin-dependent malonate decarboxylase
 : peptidyl-glutamate 4-carboxylase
 : salicylate decarboxylase
 : indole-3-carboxylate decarboxylase
 : pyrrole-2-carboxylate decarboxylase
 : ethylmalonyl-CoA decarboxylase
 : L-glutamyl-[BtrI acyl-carrier protein] decarboxylase
 : carboxynorspermidine decarboxylase
 : 2-oxo-4-hydroxy-4-carboxy-5-ureidoimidazoline decarboxylase *	 
 : 4-hydroxy-3-polyprenylbenzoate decarboxylase *	 
 : phosphomevalonate decarboxylase *	 
 : prephenate decarboxylase *	 
 : malolactic enzyme *	 
 : phenacrylate decarboxylase *	 
 : γ-resorcylate decarboxylase *	 
 : 3-dehydro-4-phosphotetronate decarboxylase *	 
 : L-tryptophan decarboxylase *	 
 : fatty acid photodecarboxylase	 
 : 3,4-dihydroxyphenylacetaldehyde synthase *	 
 : 4-hydroxyphenylacetaldehyde synthase *	 
 : phenylacetaldehyde synthase *	 
 : bisphosphomevalonate decarboxylase *	 
 : siroheme decarboxylase *	 
 : oxaloacetate decarboxylase *	 
 : trans-aconitate decarboxylase *	 
 : cis-3-alkyl-4-alkyloxetan-2-one decarboxylase *	 
 : indoleacetate decarboxylase *	 
 : D-ornithine/D-lysine decarboxylase *	 
 : 2-[(L-alanin-3-ylcarbamoyl)methyl]-2-hydroxybutanedioate decarboxylase *	 
 : isophthalyl-CoA decarboxylase *	 
 : phenylacetate decarboxylase *	 
 : 3-oxoisoapionate decarboxylase *	 
 : 3-oxoisoapionate-4-phosphate decarboxylase *
 *No Wikipedia article

EC 4.1.2: Aldehyde-lyases
 EC 4.1.2.1: Now included with  4-hydroxy-2-oxoglutarate aldolase
 : ketotetrose-phosphate aldolase
 EC 4.1.2.3: deleted, was pentosealdolase.
 : deoxyribose-phosphate aldolase
 : L-threonine aldolase
 EC 4.1.2.7:  Now included with  fructose-bisphosphate aldolase
 : indole-3-glycerol-phosphate lyase
 : phosphoketolase
 : (R)-mandelonitrile lyase
 : hydroxymandelonitrile lyase
 : 2-dehydropantoate aldolase
 : fructose-bisphosphate aldolase
 : 2-dehydro-3-deoxy-phosphogluconate aldolase
 EC 4.1.2.15:  Now , 3-deoxy-7-phosphoheptulonate synthase
 EC 4.1.2.16:  Now , 3-deoxy-8-phosphooctulonate synthase
 : L-fuculose-phosphate aldolase
 : 2-dehydro-3-deoxy-L-pentonate aldolase
 : rhamnulose-1-phosphate aldolase
 : 2-dehydro-3-deoxyglucarate aldolase
 : 2-dehydro-3-deoxy-6-phosphogalactonate aldolase
 : fructose-6-phosphate phosphoketolase
 : 3-deoxy-D-manno-octulosonate aldolase
 : dimethylaniline-N-oxide aldolase
 : dihydroneopterin aldolase
 : phenylserine aldolase
 : sphinganine-1-phosphate aldolase
 : 2-dehydro-3-deoxy-D-pentonate aldolase
 : 5-dehydro-2-deoxyphosphogluconate aldolase
 EC 4.1.2.30: Now }, 17α-hydroxyprogesterone deacetylase
 EC 4.1.2.31: Now included with  4-hydroxy-2-oxoglutarate aldolase
 : trimethylamine-oxide aldolase
 : fucosterol-epoxide lyase
 : 4-(2-carboxyphenyl)-2-oxobut-3-enoate aldolase
 : propioin synthase
 : lactate aldolase
 EC 4.1.2.37: Now covered by  [aliphatic (R)-hydroxynitrile lyase] and  [(S)-hydroxynitrile ketone-lyase (cyanide forming)]
 : benzoin aldolase
 : tagatose-bisphosphate aldolase
 : D-threonine aldolase
 : 3-hexulose-6-phosphate synthase
 : benzoyl-CoA-dihydrodiol lyase
 : trans-o-hydroxybenzylidenepyruvate hydratase-aldolase
 : aliphatic (R)-hydroxynitrile lyase
 : (S)-hydroxynitrile lyase
 : low-specificity L-threonine aldolase
 : L-allo-threonine aldolase
 : 6-carboxytetrahydropterin synthase
 * : 6-carboxytetrahydropterin synthase *	 
 * : 2-dehydro-3-deoxy-D-gluconate aldolase *	 
 * : 4-hydroxy-2-oxoheptanedioate aldolase *	 
 * : 2-keto-3-deoxy-L-rhamnonate aldolase *	 
 * : L-threo-3-deoxy-hexylosonate aldolase *	 
 * : 2-dehydro-3-deoxy-phosphogluconate/2-dehydro-3-deoxy-6-phosphogalactonate aldolase *	 
 * : 2-amino-4,5-dihydroxy-6-oxo-7-(phosphooxy)heptanoate synthase *	 
 * : sulfofructosephosphate aldolase *	 
 * : 2-dehydro-3,6-dideoxy-6-sulfogluconate aldolase *	 
 * : dihydroneopterin phosphate aldolase *	 
 * : dihydroneopterin triphosphate aldolase *	 
 * : feruloyl-CoA hydratase/lyase *	 
 * : 5-deoxyribulose 1-phosphate aldolase *	 
 * : 2-hydroxyacyl-CoA lyase *	 
 *No Wikipedia article

EC 4.1.3: Oxo-Acid-Lyases
 : isocitrate lyase
 EC 4.1.3.2: Now , malate synthase
 : N-acetylneuraminate lyase
 : hydroxymethylglutaryl-CoA lyase
 EC 4.1.3.5: Now , hydroxymethylglutaryl-CoA synthase
 : citrate (pro-3S)-lyase
 EC 4.1.3.7: Now , citrate (Si)-synthase
 EC 4.1.3.8: Now , ATP citrate synthase
 EC 4.1.3.9: Now , 2-hydroxyglutarate synthase	
 EC 4.1.3.10: Now , 3-ethylmalate synthase
 EC 4.1.3.11: Now , 3-propylmalate synthase
 EC 4.1.3.12: Now , 2-isopropylmalate synthase
 : oxalomalate lyase
 : L-erythro-3-hydroxyaspartate aldolase
 EC 4.1.3.15: Now , 2-hydroxy-3-oxoadipate synthase
 : 4-hydroxy-2-oxoglutarate aldolase
 : 4-hydroxy-4-methyl-2-oxoglutarate aldolase
 EC 4.1.3.18: Now , acetolactate synthase
 EC 4.1.3.19: Now 
 EC 4.1.3.20: Now 
 EC 4.1.3.21: Now 
 : citramalate lyase
 EC 4.1.3.23: Now , decylcitrate synthase
 : malyl-CoA lyase
 : (S)-citramalyl-CoA lyase
 : 3-hydroxy-3-isohexenylglutaryl-CoA lyase
 : anthranilate synthase
 EC 4.1.3.28: Now , citrate (Re)-synthase
 EC 4.1.3.29: Now , decylhomocitrate synthase
 : methylisocitrate lyase
 EC 4.1.3.31: Now , 2-methylcitrate synthase
 : 2,3-dimethylmalate lyase
 : Now 
 : citryl-CoA lyase
 : (1-hydroxycyclohexan-1-yl)acetyl-CoA lyase
 : naphthoate synthase
 EC 4.1.3.37: Now , 1-deoxy-D-xylulose 5-phosphate synthase
 : aminodeoxychorismate lyase
 : 4-hydroxy-2-oxovalerate aldolase
 : chorismate lyase
 : 3-hydroxy-D-aspartate aldolase
 : (4S)-4-hydroxy-2-oxoglutarate aldolase *	 
 : 4-hydroxy-2-oxohexanoate aldolase *	 
 : tRNA 4-demethylwyosine synthase (AdoMet-dependent) *	 
 : 3-hydroxybenzoate synthase *	 
 : (R)-citramalyl-CoA lyase * 
 *No Wikipedia article

EC 4.1.99: Other Carbon-Carbon Lyases
 : tryptophanase
 : tyrosine phenol-lyase
 : deoxyribodipyrimidine photo-lyase
  EC 4.1.99.4: Now , 1-aminocyclopropane-1-carboxylate deaminase
  EC 4.1.99.5: octadecanal decarbonylase
  EC 4.1.99.6: Now , trichodiene synthase
  EC 4.1.99.7: Now , aristolochene synthase
  EC 4.1.99.8: Now , pinene synthase
  EC 4.1.99.9: Now , myrcene synthase
  EC 4.1.99.10: Now , (4S)-limonene synthase
 : benzylsuccinate synthase
 : 3,4-dihydroxy-2-butanone-4-phosphate synthase
 : (6-4)DNA photolyase
 : spore photoproduct lyase
 : geosmin synthase
 : phosphomethylpyrimidine synthase
 : 2-iminoacetate synthase
 :  3-amino-4-hydroxybenzoate synthase * 
 :  Now  (5-formylfuran-3-yl)methyl phosphate synthase.
 :  GTP 3′,8-cyclase * 
 :  5-hydroxybenzimidazole synthase * 
 :  L-tyrosine isonitrile synthase * 
 :  L-tryptophan isonitrile synthase * 
 :  3-amino-5-[(4-hydroxyphenyl)methyl]-4,4-dimethylpyrrolidin-2-one *
 *No Wikipedia article

EC 4.2: Carbon-Oxygen Lyases

EC 4.2.1: Hydro-lyases
 : carbonic anhydrase
 : fumarate hydratase
 : aconitate hydratase
 : arabinonate dehydratase
 : galactonate dehydratase
 : altronate dehydratase
 : mannonate dehydratase
 : dihydroxy-acid dehydratase
 : 3-dehydroquinate dehydratase
 : phosphopyruvate hydratase (enolase)
 : phosphogluconate dehydratase
 EC 4.2.1.13: Now , L-serine ammonia-lyase
 EC 4.2.1.14: Now , D-serine ammonia-lyase
 EC 4.2.1.15: Identical with  cystathionine γ-lyase
 EC 4.2.1.16: Now , threonine ammonia-lyase
 : enoyl-CoA hydratase
 : methylglutaconyl-CoA hydratase
 : imidazoleglycerol-phosphate dehydratase
 : tryptophan synthase
 EC 4.2.1.21: Now  cystathionine β-synthase
 : cystathionine β-synthase
 EC 4.2.1.23: deleted, the reaction was due to a side-reaction of  cystathionine β-synthase
 : porphobilinogen synthase
 : L-arabinonate dehydratase
 : acetylenecarboxylate hydratase
 : propanediol dehydratase
 EC 4.2.1.29: Now , indoleacetaldoxime dehydratase
 : glycerol dehydratase
 : maleate hydratase
 : L(+)-tartrate dehydratase
 : 3-isopropylmalate dehydratase
 : (S)-2-methylmalate dehydratase
 : (R)-2-methylmalate dehydratase
 : homoaconitate hydratase
 EC 4.2.1.37: Now , trans-epoxysuccinate hydrolase
 EC 4.2.1.38: Now , erythro-3-hydroxyaspartate ammonia-lyase
 : gluconate dehydratase
 : glucarate dehydratase
 : 5-dehydro-4-deoxyglucarate dehydratase
 : galactarate dehydratase
 : 2-dehydro-3-deoxy-L-arabinonate dehydratase
 : myo-inosose-2 dehydratase
 : CDP-glucose 4,6-dehydratase
 : dTDP-glucose 4,6-dehydratase
 : GDP-mannose 4,6-dehydratase
 : D-glutamate cyclase
 : urocanate hydratase
 : pyrazolylalanine synthase
 : prephenate dehydratase
 EC 4.2.1.52: Now , 4-hydroxy-2,3,4,5-tetrahydrodipicolinate synthase.
 : oleate hydratase
 : lactoyl-CoA dehydratase
 : 3-hydroxybutyryl-CoA dehydratase
 : itaconyl-CoA hydratase
 : isohexenylglutaconyl-CoA hydratase
 EC 4.2.1.58: The reaction described is covered by 
 : 3-hydroxyacyl-[acyl-carrier-protein] dehydratase
 EC 4.2.1.60:  3-hydroxydecanoyl-(acyl-carrier-protein) dehydratase
 : 5α-hydroxysteroid dehydratase
 EC 4.2.1.63: Now known to comprise two enzymes, microsomal epoxide hydrolase and soluble epoxide hydrolase
 EC 4.2.1.64: Now known to comprise two enzymes, microsomal epoxide hydrolase and soluble epoxide hydrolase
 : 3-cyanoalanine hydratase
 : cyanide hydratase
 : D-fuconate dehydratase
 : L-fuconate dehydratase
 : cyanamide hydratase
 : pseudouridylate synthase
 EC 4.2.1.72: Now , acetylenedicarboxylate decarboxylase
 : protoaphin-aglucone dehydratase (cyclizing)
 : long-chain-enoyl-CoA hydratase
 : uroporphyrinogen-III synthase
 : UDP-glucose 4,6-dehydratase
 : trans-L-3-hydroxyproline dehydratase
 : (S)-norcoclaurine synthase
 : 2-methylcitrate dehydratase
 : 2-oxopent-4-enoate hydratase
 : D(-)-tartrate dehydratase
 : xylonate dehydratase
 : 4-oxalmesaconate hydratase
 : nitrile hydratase
 : dimethylmaleate hydratase
 : octopamine dehydratase
 : synephrine dehydratase
 : L-rhamnonate dehydratase
 : arogenate dehydratase
 : hydroperoxide dehydratase
 : ATP-dependent NAD(P)H-hydrate dehydratase
 : scytalone dehydratase
 : kievitone hydratase
 : 4a-hydroxytetrahydrobiopterin dehydratase
 : phaseollidin hydratase
 : 16α-hydroxyprogesterone dehydratase
 : 2-methylisocitrate dehydratase
 : cyclohexa-1,5-dienecarbonyl-CoA hydratase
 EC 4.2.1.102: Now , cyclohexa-1,5-dienecarbonyl-CoA hydratase
 : cyclohexyl-isocyanide hydratase
 : cyanase
 : 2-hydroxyisoflavanone dehydratase
 : bile-acid 7α-dehydratase
 : 3α,7α,12α-trihydroxy-5β-cholest-24-enoyl-CoA hydratase
 : ectoine synthase
 : methylthioribulose 1-phosphate dehydratase
 : aldos-2-ulose dehydratase
 : 1,5-anhydro-D-fructose dehydratase
 : acetylene hydratase
 : o-succinylbenzoate synthase
 : methanogen homoaconitase
 : UDP-N-acetylglucosamine 4,6-dehydratase (configuration-inverting)
 : 3-hydroxypropionyl-CoA dehydratase
 : 2-methylcitrate dehydratase (2-methyl-trans-aconitate forming)
 : 3-dehydroshikimate dehydratase
 : enoyl-CoA hydratase 2
 : 4-hydroxybutanoyl-CoA dehydratase
 : colneleate synthase
 : tryptophan synthase (indole-salvaging)
 : tetrahymanol synthase
 : arabidiol synthase
 : dammarenediol II synthase
 : N-acetylmuramic acid 6-phosphate etherase
 : linalool dehydratase
 : lupan-3β,20-diol synthase
 : squalene—hopanol cyclase
 : D-lactate dehydratase
 : carotenoid 1,2-hydratase
 : 2-hydroxyhexa-2,4-dienoate hydratase
 : copal-8-ol diphosphate hydratase
 : very-long-chain (3R)-3-hydroxyacyl-CoA dehydratase
 : UDP-N-acetylglucosamine 4,6-dehydratase (configuration-retaining)
 : ADP-dependent NAD(P)H-hydrate dehydratase
 : sporulenol synthase
 : (+)-Caryolan-1-ol synthase
 : pterocarpan synthase *
 : gluconate/galactonate dehydratase *
 : 2-dehydro-3-deoxyD-arabinonate dehydratase *
 : 5′-oxoaverantin cyclase *
 : versicolorin B synthase *
 : 3-amino-5-hydroxybenzoate synthase *
 : capreomycidine synthase *
 : L-galactonate dehydratase *
 : 5,6,7,8-tetrahydromethanopterin hydro-lyase *
 : 2-methylfumaryl-CoA hydratase *
 : crotonobetainyl-CoA hydratase *
 : short-chain-enoyl-CoA hydratase *
 : chorismate dehydratase *
 : hydroperoxy icosatetraenoate dehydratase *
 : 3-methylfumaryl-CoA hydratase *
 : tetracenomycin F2 cyclase *
 : (methylthio)acryloyl-CoA hydratase *
 : L-talarate dehydratase *
 : (R)-2-hydroxyisocaproyl-CoA dehydratase *
 : galactarate dehydratase (D-threo-forming) *
 : dTDP-4-dehydro-6-deoxy-α-glucopyranose 2,3-dehydratase *
 : 2,5-diamino-6-(5-phospho-D-ribosylamino)pyrimidin-4(3H)-one isomerase/dehydratase *
 : bisanhydrobacterioruberin hydratase *
 : 6-deoxy-6-sulfo-D-gluconate dehydratase *
 : 2-oxo-hept-4-ene-1,7-dioate hydratase *
 : dTDP-4-dehydro-2,6-dideoxy-D-glucose 3-dehydratase *
 : chlorophyllide a 31-hydratase *
 : phosphinomethylmalate isomerase *
 : (R)-2-hydroxyglutaryl-CoA dehydratase *
 : GDP-4-dehydro-6-deoxy-α-D-mannose 3-dehydratase *
 : 3-vinyl bacteriochlorophyllide d 31-hydratase *
 : 2-(ω-methylthio)alkylmalate dehydratase *
 : cis-L-3-hydroxyproline dehydratase *
 : trans-4-hydroxy-L-proline dehydratase *
 : ent-8α-hydroxylabd-13-en-15-yl diphosphate synthase *
 : peregrinol diphosphate synthase *
 : (R)-3-(aryl)lactoyl-CoA dehydratase *
 : L-lyxonate dehydratase *
 : (2S)-3-sulfopropanediol dehydratase *
 *No Wikipedia article

EC 4.2.2: Acting on Polysaccharides
 : hyaluronate lyase
 : pectate lyase
 : mannuronate-specific alginate lyase
 : chondroitin AC lyase
 : oligogalacturonide lyase
 : heparin lyase
 : heparin-sulfate lyase
 : pectate disaccharide-lyase
 : pectin lyase
 : guluronate-specific alginate lyase
 : xanthan lyase
 : exo-(1→4)-α-D-glucan lyase
 : glucuronan lyase
 : anhydrosialidase
 : levan fructotransferase (DFA-IV-forming)
 : inulin fructotransferase (DFA-I-forming)
 : inulin fructotransferase (DFA-III-forming)
 : chondroitin B lyase
 : chondroitin-sulfate-ABC endolyase
 : chondroitin-sulfate-ABC exolyase
 : pectate trisaccharide-lyase
 : rhamnogalacturonan endolyase
 : rhamnogalacturonan exolyase
 : gellan lyase
 : oligo-alginate lyase *
 : pectin monosaccharide-lyase * 
 *No Wikipedia article

EC 4.2.3: Acting on phosphates
 : threonine synthase
 : ethanolamine-phosphate phospho-lyase
 : methylglyoxal synthase
 : 3-dehydroquinate synthase
 : chorismate synthase
 : trichodiene synthase
 : pentalenene synthase
 : casbene synthase
 : aristolochene synthase
 : (–)-endo-fenchol synthase
 : sabinene-hydrate synthase
 : 6-pyruvoyltetrahydropterin synthase
 : (+)-δ-cadinene synthase
 : myrcene synthase
 : (4S)-limonene synthase
 : taxadiene synthase
 : abietadiene synthase
 : ent-kaurene synthase
 : (R)-limonene synthase
 : vetispiradiene synthase
 : germacradienol synthase
 : germacrene-A synthase
 : amorpha-4,11-diene synthase
 : S-linalool synthase
 : R-linalool synthase
 : isoprene synthase
 : ent-cassa-12,15-diene synthase
 : ent-sandaracopimaradiene synthase
 : ent-pimara-8(14),15-diene synthase
 : ent-pimara-9(11),15-diene synthase
 : levopimaradiene synthase
 : stemar-13-ene synthase
 : stemod-13(17)-ene synthase
 : syn-pimara-7,15-diene synthase
 : terpentetriene synthase
 : epi-isozizaene synthase
 : α-bisabolene synthase
 : epi-cedrol synthase
 : (Z)-γ-bisabolene synthase
 : elisabethatriene synthase
 : aphidicolan-16β-ol synthase
 : fusicocca-2,10(14)-diene synthase
 : isopimara-7,15-diene synthase
 : phyllocladan-16α-ol synthase
 : α-farnesene synthase
 : β-farnesene synthase
 : (3S,6E)-nerolidol synthase
 : (3R,6E)-nerolidol synthase
 :  (+)-α-santalene synthase [(2Z,6Z)-farnesyl diphosphate cyclizing]
 : β-phellandrene synthase (neryl-diphosphate-cyclizing)
 : (4S)-β-phellandrene synthase (geranyl-diphosphate-cyclizing)
 : (+)-endo-β-bergamotene synthase [(2Z,6Z)-farnesyl diphosphate cyclizing]
 : (–)-endo-α-bergamotene synthase [(2Z,6Z)-farnesyl diphosphate cyclizing]
 : (S)-β-bisabolene synthase
 : γ-humulene synthase
 : (–)-β-caryophyllene synthase
 : longifolene synthase
 : (E)-γ-bisabolene synthase
 : germacrene C synthase
 : 5-epiaristolochene synthase
 : (–)-γ-cadinene synthase [(2Z,6E)-farnesyl diphosphate cyclizing]
 : (+)-cubenene synthase
 : (+)-epicubenol synthase
 : zingiberene synthase
 : β-selinene cyclase
 : cis-muuroladiene synthase
 : β-eudesmol synthase
 : (+)-α-barbatene synthase
 : patchoulol synthase
 : (E,E)-germacrene B synthase
 : α-gurjunene synthase
 : valencene synthase
 : presilphiperfolanol synthase
 : (–)-germacrene D synthase
 : (+)-δ-selinene synthase
 : (+)-germacrene D synthase
 : β-chamigrene synthase
 : thujopsene synthase
 : α-longipinene synthase
 : exo-α-bergamotene synthase
 : α-santalene synthase
 : β-santalene synthase
 : 10-epi-γ-eudesmol synthase
 : α-eudesmol synthase
 : 7-epi-α-selinene synthase
 : α-guaiene synthase
 : viridiflorene synthase
 : (+)-β-caryophyllene synthase
 : 5-epi-α-selinene synthase
 : cubebol synthase
 : (+)-γ-cadinene synthase
 : δ-guaiene synthase
 : γ-curcumene synthase
 : (–)-α-cuprenene synthase
 : avermitilol synthase
 : (–)-δ-cadinene synthase
 : (+)-T-muurolol synthase
 : labdatriene synthase
 : bicyclogermacrene synthase
 : 7-epi-sesquithujene synthase
 : sesquithujene synthase
 : ent-isokaurene synthase
 : α-humulene synthase
 : tricyclene synthase
 : (E)-β-ocimene synthase
 : (+)-car-3-ene synthase
 : 1,8-cineole synthase
 : (–)-sabinene synthase
 : (+)-sabinene synthase
 : (–)-α-terpineol synthase
 : (+)-α-terpineol synthase
 : terpinolene synthase
 : γ-terpinene synthase
 : α-terpinene synthase
 : (+)-camphene synthase
 : (–)-camphene synthase
 : 2-methylisoborneol synthase
 : (-)-α-pinene synthase
 : (-)-β-pinene synthase
 : (+)-α-pinene synthase
 : (+)-β-pinene synthase
 : β-sesquiphellandrene synthase
 : 2-deoxy-scyllo-inosose synthase
 : α-muurolene synthase
 : γ-muurolene synthase
 : β-copaene synthase
 : β-cubebene synthase
 : (+)-sativene synthase
 : tetraprenyl-β-curcumene synthase
 : miltiradiene synthase
 : neoabietadiene synthase
 : α-copaene synthase
 : 5-phosphooxy-L-lysine phospho-lyase
 : Δ6-protoilludene synthase
 : α-isocomene synthase
 : (E)-2-epi-β-caryophyllene synthase
 : (+)-epi-α-bisabolol synthase
 : valerena-4,7(11)-diene synthase
 : cis-abienol synthase
 : sclareol synthase	 
 : 7-epizingiberene synthase [(2Z,6Z)-farnesyl diphosphate cyclizing]	 
 : kunzeaol synthase	 
 : geranyllinalool synthase	 
 : ophiobolin F synthase	 
 : cyclooctat-9-en-7-ol synthase	 
 : pimaradiene synthase	 
 : cembrene C synthase	 
 : nephthenol synthase	 
 : cembrene A synthase	 
 : pentamethylcyclopentadecatrienol synthase	 
 : 2-epi-5-epi-valiolone synthase	 
 : (5-formylfuran-3-yl)methyl phosphate synthase	 
 : demethyl-4-deoxygadusol synthase	 
 : 2-epi-valiolone synthase	 
 : hydroxysqualene synthase	 
 : (+)-isoafricanol synthase	 
 : (–)-spiroviolene synthase	 
 : tsukubadiene synthase	 
 : (2S,3R,6S,9S)-(–)-protoillud-7-ene synthase	 
 : (3S)-(+)-asterisca-2(9),6-diene synthase	 
 : (–)-α-amorphene synthase	 
 : (+)-corvol ether B synthase	 
 : (+)-eremophilene synthase	 
 : (1R,4R,5S)-(–)-guaia-6,10(14)-diene synthase	 
 : (+)-(1E,4E,6S,7R)-germacra-1(10),4-dien-6-ol synthase	 
 : dolabella-3,7-dien-18-ol synthase	 
 : dolathalia-3,7,11-triene synthase	 
 : 7-epi-α-eudesmol synthase	 
 : 4-epi-cubebol synthase	 
 : (+)-corvol ether A synthase	 
 : 10-epi-juneol synthase	 
 : τ-cadinol synthase	 
 : (2E,6E)-hedycaryol synthase	 
 : 10-epi-cubebol synthase	 
 : sesterfisherol synthase	 
 : β-thujene synthase	 
 : stellata-2,6,19-triene synthase	 
 : guaia-4,6-diene synthase	 
 : pseudolaratriene synthase	 
 : selina-4(15),7(11)-diene synthase	 
 : pristinol synthase	 
 : nezukol synthase	 
 : 5-hydroxy-α-gurjunene synthase	 
 : ent-atiserene synthase	 
 : ent-13-epi-manoyl oxide synthase	 
 : (2Z,6E)-hedycaryol synthase	 
 : β-geranylfarnesene synthase	 
 : 9,13-epoxylabd-14-ene synthase	 
 : manoyl oxide synthase	 
 : cycloaraneosene synthase	 
 : labda-7,13(16),14-triene synthase	 
 : (12E)-labda-8(17),12,14-triene synthase	 
 : (–)-drimenol synthase	 
 : rhizathalene A synthase	 
 : dolabradiene synthase	 
 : eudesmane-5,11-diol synthase	 
 : α-selinene synthase	 
 : (–)-5-epieremophilene synthase	 
 : β-pinacene synthase	 
 : hydropyrene synthase	 
 : hydropyrenol synthase	 
 : isoelisabethatriene synthase	 
 : valerianol synthase	 
 : sodorifen synthase

EC 4.2.99: Other Carbon-Oxygen Lyases
 EC 4.2.99.1: Now , hyaluronate lyase
 EC 4.2.99.2: Now , threonine synthase
 EC 4.2.99.3: Now , pectate lyase
 EC 4.2.99.4: Now , poly(β-D-mannuronate) lyase
 EC 4.2.99.5: deleted
 EC 4.2.99.7: Now , ethanolamine-phosphate phospho-lyase
 EC 4.2.99.8: Now , cysteine synthase
 EC 4.2.99.9: Now , cystathionine γ-synthase
 EC 4.2.99.10: Now , O-acetylhomoserine aminocarboxypropyltransferase
 EC 4.2.99.11: Now , methylglyoxal synthase
 : carboxymethyloxysuccinate lyase
 EC 4.2.99.13: Now , zeatin 9-aminocarboxyethyltransferase
 EC 4.2.99.14: Now , β-pyrazolylalanine synthase
 EC 4.2.99.15: Now , L-mimosine synthase
 EC 4.2.99.16: Now , uracilylalanine synthase
 : DNA-(apurinic or apyrimidinic site) lyase
 EC 4.2.99.19: Now , 2-hydroxypropyl-CoM lyase
 : 2-succinyl-6-hydroxy-2,4-cyclohexadiene-1-carboxylate synthase
 : isochorismate lyase
 : tuliposide A-converting enzyme *	 
 : tuliposide B-converting enzyme *	 
 : thebaine synthase *
 *No Wikipedia article

EC 4.3: Carbon-Nitrogen Lyases

EC 4.3.1: Ammonia-Lyases
 : aspartate ammonia-lyase
 : methylaspartate ammonia-lyase
 : histidine ammonia-lyase
 : formiminotetrahydrofolate cyclodeaminase
 : β-alanyl-CoA ammonia-lyase
 : ethanolamine ammonia-lyase
 EC 4.3.1.8: Now , hydroxymethylbilane synthase
 : glucosaminate ammonia-lyase
 : serine-sulfate ammonia-lyase
 EC 4.3.1.11: Deleted: inadequately characterized
 : ornithine cyclodeaminase
 : carbamoyl-serine ammonia-lyase
 : 3-aminobutyryl-CoA ammonia-lyase
 : diaminopropionate ammonia-lyase
 : threo-3-hydroxy-L-aspartate ammonia-lyase
 : L-serine ammonia-lyase
 : D-serine ammonia-lyase
 : threonine ammonia-lyase
 : erythro-3-hydroxy-L-aspartate ammonia-lyase
 : 3,4-dihydroxyphenylalanine reductive deaminase
 : tyrosine ammonia-lyase
 : phenylalanine ammonia-lyase
 : phenylalanine/tyrosine ammonia-lyase
 EC 4.3.1.26: Now , dichlorochromopyrrolate synthase
 : threo-3-hydroxy-D-aspartate ammonia-lyase
 : L-lysine cyclodeaminase
 : D-glucosaminate-6-phosphate ammonia-lyase *	 
 : dTDP-4-amino-4,6-dideoxy-D-glucose ammonia-lyase *	 
 : L-tryptophan ammonia lyase *	 
 : 7,8-didemethyl-8-hydroxy-5-deazariboflavin synthase *
 *No Wikipedia article

EC 4.3.2: Amidine-Lyases
 :  argininosuccinate lyase
 :  adenylosuccinate lyase
 :  ureidoglycolate lyase
 :  purine imidazole-ring cyclase
 :  peptidylamidoglycolate lyase
 :  γ-L-glutamyl-butirosin B γ-glutamyl cyclotransferase
 : glutathione-specific γ-glutamylcyclotransferase *	 
 : γ-glutamylamine cyclotransferase *	 
 : γ-glutamylcyclotransferase *	 
 : imidazole glycerol-phosphate synthase *
 *No Wikipedia article

EC 4.3.3: Amine-Lyases
 : 3-ketovalidoxylamine C-N-lyase
 : strictosidine synthase
 : deacetylisoipecoside synthase
 : deacetylipecoside synthase
 : 4′-demethylrebeccamycin synthase
 : pyridoxal 5′-phosphate synthase (glutamine hydrolysing)
 : 4-hydroxy-tetrahydrodipicolinate synthase

EC 4.3.99: Other Carbon-Nitrogen Lyases
 EC 4.3.99.1: Now , cyanate hydratase
 EC 4.3.99.2: Now , carboxybiotin decarboxylase	
 : 7-carboxy-7-deazaguanine synthase
 : choline trimethylamine-lyase *
 *No Wikipedia article

EC 4.4: Carbon-Sulfur Lyases

EC 4.4.1: Carbon-sulfur lyases (only sub-subclass identified to date)
 : cystathionine γ-lyase
 : homocysteine desulfhydrase
 : dimethylpropiothetin dethiomethylase
 : alliin lyase
 : lactoylglutathione lyase
 EC 4.4.1.7: Now included with  glutathione transferase
 : L-3-cyanoalanine synthase
 : cysteine lyase
 : methionine γ-lyase
 : cysteine-S-conjugate β-lyase
 : 1-aminocyclopropane-1-carboxylate synthase
 : D-cysteine desulfhydrase
 : selenocysteine lyase
 : holocytochrome-c synthase
 EC 4.4.1.18: Now , prenylcysteine oxidase
 : phosphosulfolactate synthase
 : leukotriene-C4 synthase
 : S-ribosylhomocysteine lyase
 : S-(hydroxymethyl)glutathione synthase
 : 2-hydroxypropyl-CoM lyase
 : (2R)-sulfolactate sulfo-lyase
 : L-cysteate sulfo-lyase
 : olivetolic acid cyclase
 EC 4.4.1.27: Now , carbon disulfide hydrolase	 
 *No Wikipedia article

EC 4.5: Carbon-Halide Lyases

EC 4.5.1: Carbon-halide lyases (only sub-subclass identified to date)
 : DDT-dehydrochlorinase
 : 3-chloro-D-alanine dehydrochlorinase
 : dichloromethane dehalogenase
 : L-2-amino-4-chloropent-4-enoate dehydrochlorinase
 : S-carboxymethylcysteine synthase

EC 4.6: Phosphorus-Oxygen Lyases

EC 4.6.1: Phosphorus-oxygen lyases (only sub-subclass identified to date)
 : adenylate cyclase
 : guanylate cyclase
 EC 4.6.1.3: Now , 3-dehydroquinate synthase
 EC 4.6.1.4: Now , chorismate synthase
 EC 4.6.1.5: Now , pentalenene synthase
 : cytidylate cyclase
 EC 4.6.1.7: Now , casbene synthase
 EC 4.6.1.8: Now , (-)-endo-fenchol synthase
 EC 4.6.1.9: Now Now , sabinene-hydrate synthase
 EC 4.6.1.10: Now , 6-pyruvoyltetrahydropterin synthase
 EC 4.6.1.11: Now , (+)-δ-cadinene synthase
 : 2-C-methyl-D-erythritol 2,4-cyclodiphosphate synthase
 : phosphatidylinositol diacylglycerol-lyase
 : glycosylphosphatidylinositol diacylglycerol-lyase
 : FAD-AMP lyase (cyclizing)
 : tRNA-intron lyase
 : cyclic pyranopterin monophosphate synthase *	 
 : pancreatic ribonuclease *	 
 : ribonuclease T2 *	 
 : ribonuclease U2 *	 
 : Enterobacter ribonuclease *	 
 : Bacillus subtilis ribonuclease *	 
 : ribotoxin *	 
 : ribonuclease T1 *	 
 : bacteriophage T4 restriction endoribonuclease RegB *
 *No Wikipedia article

EC 4.7: Carbon-phosphorus lyases

EC 4.7.1: Carbon-phosphorus lyases (only sub-subclass identified to date)

  α-D ribose 1-methylphosphonate 5-phosphate C-P-lyase *

 *No Wikipedia article

EC 4.8: Nitrogen-oxygen lyases

EC 4.8.1: Hydro-lyases

 : L-piperazate synthase *
 : aliphatic aldoxime dehydratase *
 : indoleacetaldoxime dehydratase *
 : phenylacetaldoxime dehydratase * 
 *No Wikipedia article

EC 4.98: ATP-independent chelatases

EC 4.98.1: Forming coordination complexes

 : protoporphyrin ferrochelatase

EC 4.99: Other Lyases

EC 4.99.1: Sole sub-subclass for lyases that do not belong in the other subclasses
 : Now EC 4.98.1.1
 : alkylmercury lyase
 : sirohydrochlorin cobaltochelatase
 : sirohydrochlorin ferrochelatase
 EC 4.99.1.5: Now , aliphatic aldoxime dehydratase
 EC 4.99.1.6: Now , indoleacetaldoxime dehydratase
 EC 4.99.1.7: Now , phenylacetaldoxime dehydratase
 : heme ligase
 : coproporphyrin ferrochelatase *	 
 : magnesium dechelatase *	 
 : sirohydrochlorin nickelchelatase *	 
 : pyridinium-3,5-bisthiocarboxylic acid mononucleotide nickel chelatase *
 *No Wikipedia article

References 

EC4